This page lists public opinion polls conducted for the 2022 Colombian presidential election, the first round of which was held on 29 May. Because no candidate won a majority, a second round was held on 19 June between the top two candidates, Gustavo Petro and Rodolfo Hernández Suárez.

First round

Graphical summary

Table of values

Polls prior to the finalisation of candidates

Graphical summary

Table of values

2022

2021

2020

Second round

Petro vs. Hernández

Other scenarios
The following charts display matchups involving a candidate who did not qualify for the second round.

Petro vs. Gutiérrez

Petro vs. Fajardo

Petro vs. Betancourt

Coalition primaries

Historic Pact

Team for Colombia

Hope Center

References

2022